Glycolonitrile, also called hydroxyacetonitrile or formaldehyde cyanohydrin, is the organic compound with the formula HOCH2CN.  It is the simplest cyanohydrin and it is derived from formaldehyde. It is a colourless liquid that dissolves in water and ether. Because glycolonitrile decomposes readily into formaldehyde and hydrogen cyanide, it is listed as an extremely hazardous substance. In January 2019, astronomers reported the detection of glycolonitrile, another possible building block of life among other such molecules, in outer space.

Synthesis and reactions
Glycolonitrile is produced by reacting formaldehyde with hydrogen cyanide under acidic conditions. This reaction is catalysed by base..  Glycolonitrile polymerizes under alkaline conditions above pH 7.0. As the product of polymerization is an amine with a basic character, the reaction is self-catalysed, gaining in speed with ongoing conversion.

Glycolonitrile can react with ammonia to give aminoacetonitrile, which can be hydrolysed to give glycine:
HOCH2CN  +  NH3   →   H2NCH2CN  +  H2O
H2NCH2CN  + 2 H2O   →   H2NCH2CO2H  +  NH3
The industrially important chelating agent EDTA is prepared from glycolonitrile and ethylenediamine followed by hydrolysis of the resulting tetranitrile.  Nitrilotriacetic acid is prepared similarly.

References

Cyanohydrins